Chibunna "Funny Bone" Stanley (born 28 October 1985) is a Nigerian Nollywood actor and stand up comedian from Anambra state. At a show in Anambra, he imployed the then Anambra Governor,Obiano to invest in youth and he tasked the political appointees of the state to be active.

In 2020, he won the 2020 AMVCA Best Actor in a Comedy category award beating other 4 contestants.

Selected filmography

Films 

 Finding Odera (2022)
 Aki and Pawpaw (2021)
 Progressive Tailors Club (2021)
 Desperate Houseboys (2021)
 Three Thieves (2019)
 Smash (2018)
 The Bodyguard (2018)
 Sergeant Tutu (2017)
 Brother Jekwu (2016)
 When Love Happens Again (2016)
 Fast Cash (2016)

Television 

 Squatterz (2012)

References

External links 

1985 births
Living people
Nigerian male actors
21st-century Nigerian male actors
Nigerian male comedians
Nigerian stand-up comedians